Sumner Murray Redstone ( Rothstein; May 27, 1923 – August 11, 2020) was an American billionaire businessman and media magnate. He was the founder and chairman of the second incarnation of Viacom which was dissolved in 2019 (a year before Redstone's death) and was the majority owner and chairman of the National Amusements theater chain. Through National Amusements, Redstone, up until his death, was, and his family remains, majority voting shareholder of mass media conglomerate ViacomCBS, in turn, the parent company of the Paramount Pictures film studio, the CBS television network, and various cable networks. According to Forbes, as of April 2020, he was worth US$2.6 billion.

Redstone was formerly the executive chairman of both CBS and Viacom. In February 2016, at age 92, Redstone resigned both chairmanships following a court-ordered examination by a geriatric psychiatrist. He was ultimately succeeded by Les Moonves at CBS and Philippe Dauman at Viacom.

Early life and education 
Redstone was born to a Jewish family in Boston, Massachusetts, to Belle (née Ostrovsky) and Michael Rothstein. In 1940, his father changed the family surname from "Rothstein" to "Redstone" ("Red stone" is the translation of the Yiddish name, "Rothstein"). Michael Rothstein owned Northeast Theater Corporation in Dedham, Massachusetts (the forerunner of National Amusements) and the Boston branch of the Latin Quarter Nightclub.

Redstone attended the Boston Latin School, from which he graduated first in his class. In 1944, he graduated from Harvard College, where he completed the studies for his bachelor's degree in three years. Later, Redstone served as a 1st Lieutenant in the United States Army during World War II with a team at the Signals Intelligence Service that decoded Japanese messages. After his military service, he worked in Washington, D.C., and attended Georgetown University Law Center. He transferred to Harvard Law School and received his J.D. degree in 1947.

After completing law school, Redstone served as special assistant to U.S. Attorney General Tom C. Clark (who later served as Associate Justice of the Supreme Court of the United States from 1949 to 1967) and then worked for the United States Department of Justice Tax Division in Washington, D.C. and San Francisco, and thereafter entered private practice. In 1954, he joined his father's theater chain, National Amusements and in 1967, he became CEO of the company. As the company grew, Redstone came to believe that content would become more important than distribution mechanisms: channels of distribution (in varied forms) would always exist, but content would always be essential (Redstone coined the phrase, "Content is king!") He invested in Columbia Pictures, 20th Century Fox, Orion Pictures, and Paramount Pictures (Redstone's Viacom would buy Paramount in the 1990s), all of which turned over huge profits when he chose to sell their stock in the early 1980s.

On March 29, 1979, he suffered severe burns in a fire at the Copley Plaza hotel, in Boston, but survived after 30 hours of extensive surgery at Massachusetts General Hospital. Though he was warned that he might never be able to live a normal life again, eight years later he was fit enough to insist on playing tennis nearly every day and to launch a hostile takeover of Viacom. Redstone discussed the story of surviving the fire as a reflection of his strong determination and will to live.

Career

Viacom 
Looking for a new business venture, Redstone set his sights on Viacom International, a company which he had already been buying stock in as an investment and was a spin-off of CBS in 1971 after the FCC ruled at the time that television networks could not syndicate programs following their network run (a ruling that has since been repealed). Viacom syndicated most of CBS's in-house productions (such as Hawaii Five-O and Gunsmoke, as well as the pre-1960 Desilu Productions library which CBS acquired in 1960, I Love Lucy being among the acquired programs), but also found syndicating other programs highly lucrative, including most of Carsey-Werner Productions' shows (The Cosby Show, Roseanne, and A Different World), as well as syndicating shows for other companies (Columbia Pictures Television's All in the Family was one example, as was MTM Enterprises' The Mary Tyler Moore Show), and cable channels (Nickelodeon's Double Dare and Finders Keepers, co-syndicated with 20th Television, were two examples).

Viacom also owned MTV Networks (formerly known as Warner-AMEX Satellite Entertainment), which owned MTV and Nickelodeon. In addition, other properties included Showtime Networks (a pay-television network similar to HBO and Cinemax) and The Movie Channel. Viacom acquired MTV Networks in 1985 for $550 million from Steve Ross' Warner Communications. (WCI bought American Express' share and then sold the entire entity to Viacom, as they felt that, in addition to losing money from the short-lived QUBE service, they could not make a lot of money from the venture and the bias of a studio owning cable channels would be a conflict of interest. The studio's stance changed in 1996, when as Time Warner it bought Turner Broadcasting.)

After a four-month hostile takeover in 1987, Redstone won voting control of Viacom.

Paramount Pictures 
Redstone's next acquisition was the purchase of Paramount Communications (previously Gulf+Western), parent of Paramount Pictures in 1994. He engaged in a bidding war with Barry Diller (former CEO of IAC/InterActiveCorp) and John Malone (president of TCI/Liberty Media), and had to raise his bid three times. Some say that Redstone overpaid, but after he shed certain assets — the Madison Square Garden properties (which included the NBA's New York Knicks and the NHL's New York Rangers) to Charles Dolan's Cablevision and Simon & Schuster's educational publishing units to Pearson PLC — for almost $4 billion, Redstone turned Viacom's expenditure into a substantial profit. Under Redstone's leadership, Paramount produced such films as Saving Private Ryan, Titanic (one of the highest-grossing films of all time and Best Picture Academy Award winner), Braveheart (Best Picture Academy Award), and Forrest Gump (also a Best Picture winner) and the creation of the hugely successful Mission: Impossible series of pictures.

Redstone replaced the team of Jonathan Dolgen and Sherry Lansing in 2004. After arriving at Paramount in 2005, Chairman and Chief Executive Officer Brad Grey led a return to fortune at the box office. He oversaw the creation or revitalization of several major franchises, including Transformers, Star Trek and Paranormal Activity. Paramount also forged productive relationships with top-tier filmmakers and talent including J. J. Abrams, Michael Bay and Martin Scorsese. The 2010 Paramount slate achieved much success with Shutter Island and a True Grit remake, reaching the biggest box office totals in the storied careers of Martin Scorsese and the Coen Brothers, respectively. In addition, during Grey's tenure, Paramount launched its own worldwide releasing arm, Paramount Pictures International, and has released acclaimed films such as An Inconvenient Truth, Up in the Air, and There Will Be Blood.

He also purchased Blockbuster Entertainment, which included Aaron Spelling's production company and a huge library of films, much of which has been merged into Paramount Pictures. Blockbuster has now been spun off into its own independent entity. Redstone acquired CBS Corporation in 2000 and then spun it off as a separate company in 2005, taking with it all of Paramount's television shows and catalog.

In December 2005, Redstone announced that Paramount had agreed to buy DreamWorks SKG for an estimated $1.6 billion. The acquisition was completed on February 1, 2006. Subsequent financing brought Viacom's investment down to $700 million. The animation studio, DreamWorks Animation, was not included in the deal as it has been its own company since late 2004. However, Paramount had the rights to distribute films by DreamWorks Animation until 2013.

On June 1, 2012, Paramount Pictures renamed the Administration Building on the studio lot the Sumner Redstone Building in a dedication ceremony attended by employees of Paramount Pictures and Viacom.

CBS 
One of Redstone's largest acquisitions came in the form of Viacom's former parent, CBS. Former Viacom President and COO Mel Karmazin (who was then the president of CBS) proposed a merger to Redstone on favorable terms and after the merger completed in 2000, Viacom had some of the most diversified businesses imaginable. Viacom had assets in the form of broadcast networks (CBS and UPN), cable television networks (MTV, VH1, Nickelodeon, MTV2, Comedy Central, BET, Nick at Nite, Noggin/The N, TV Land, CMT, and Spike TV), pay television (Showtime and The Movie Channel), radio (Infinity Broadcasting, which produced the Howard Stern radio shows), outdoor advertising, motion pictures (Paramount Pictures), television production (Spelling Entertainment, Paramount Television, Big Ticket Entertainment, CBS Productions, and Viacom Productions), and King World Productions (a syndication unit, which notably syndicates the runaway daytime hit, The Oprah Winfrey Show, as well as Dr. Phil, Wheel of Fortune, and Jeopardy!), among others.

After CBS and Viacom split in 2006, Redstone remained chairman of both companies but two separate CEOs were appointed for each company.

Succession 
Redstone's trusts made it clear that his daughter, Shari Redstone (vice-chairwoman of the board of Viacom and CBS as well as president of National Amusements), was set to assume his role upon his death. However, a November 22, 2006, New York Times article indicated that Redstone was reconsidering his daughter's role. In 2007, they feuded publicly over issues of corporate governance and the future of the cinema chain.

Documents were made public which verify that, as part of a settlement from Sumner Redstone's first divorce, all of his stock was in irrevocable trusts that was to be left for his grandchildren. On March 1, 2010, Redstone publicly confirmed that all of his stock would be left for his five grandchildren (Brandon Korff, Kimberlee Korff, Tyler Korff, Keryn Redstone, and Lauren Redstone).

Redstone made arrangements to step down as CEO of Viacom in 2006. After Mel Karmazin resigned in 2004, two heirs apparent were named: Co-President and Co-COO Les Moonves (who was number 2 to Karmazin at CBS; he was the former head of Warner Bros. Television and before that, Lorimar Television) and Co-President and Co-COO Tom Freston (who had been president and CEO of MTV Networks since 1987 and had been with the company since the formation of MTV Networks' precursor company, Warner-AMEX Satellite Entertainment). After the Viacom split was approved by the board on June 14, 2005, Moonves headed CBS Corporation, and Freston headed the second incarnation of Viacom, Inc.

On September 5, 2006, Redstone removed Freston as president and CEO of Viacom and replaced him with director and former Viacom counsel Philippe Dauman. Redstone also brought back former CFO Tom Dooley. This was surprising to many, as Freston had been seen by many as Redstone's heir apparent, and Redstone had touted that Freston would run the company after he retired. Redstone publicly stated that he let Freston go because of Viacom's lack of aggressiveness in the digital/online arena, lack of contact with investors, and a lackluster upfront (coupled with falling viewership) at MTV Networks.

In February 2016, at age 92, after a court-ordered examination by a geriatric psychiatrist whose findings were not publicly disclosed, Redstone relinquished the chairmanship of CBS to Moonves and the chairmanship of Viacom to Dauman. In May 2016, Los Angeles Superior Court Judge David Cowan dismissed a lawsuit alleging that Redstone was mentally incompetent, although the judge stated it was "not in dispute that Redstone suffers from either mild or moderate dementia"; in addition to this, his speech was severely impaired due to a bout with aspiration pneumonia in 2014. Two weeks later, another such lawsuit was filed in Massachusetts.

Holdings 
At the time of his death, Redstone owned over seventy percent of the voting interest of ViacomCBS. ViacomCBS was controlled by Redstone through National Amusements. Redstone sold his holdings of Midway Games, of over 89 percent, in December 2008.

Books 
Redstone's autobiography, A Passion to Win (co-written with author Peter Knobler), was published in 2001 by Viacom's Simon & Schuster. This book details Redstone's life from a young boy in Boston to the difficult takeover of Viacom and the problems he overcame in purchasing and managing both Blockbuster Video and Paramount Pictures. The book also recounts the CBS merger (Viacom was a spin-off company of CBS to syndicate its programs, and the subsidiary bought the parent almost 30 years later).

Viacom's broadcasting properties at the time of A Passion to Wins release included several radio stations and two TV stations: WBZ CBS 4, which had just become a CBS O&O through a merger with Westinghouse four years before Viacom and CBS merged, and WSBK UPN 38 in Redstone's hometown, Boston.

In 2023 the book Unscripted: The Epic Battle for a Hollywood Media Empire was published in Cornerstone Press (Penguin Books), written by James B. Stewart and Rachel Abrams. The book tells the story of the Redstone dynasty.

Political views 
A longtime Democratic supporter, with a history of donating to many Democratic campaigns, including regular donations to Ted Kennedy, John Kerry, and former Senate Majority Leader Tom Daschle, Redstone endorsed Republican George W. Bush over Kerry in the 2004 Presidential election, allegedly because he argued that Bush would be better for his company and the economy. Despite this public endorsement, he donated money to Kerry during the primaries and was involved in the Rathergate scandal meant to hurt Bush's reelection.

Philanthropy 
Redstone contributed over $150 million to various philanthropic causes.

 In April 2007, Redstone announced a commitment of $105 million in charitable grants to fund research and patient care advancements in cancer and burn recovery at three major non-profit healthcare organizations. The cash contributions of $35 million were each paid out over five years to FasterCures/The Center for Accelerating Medical Solutions, based in Washington, D.C.; the Cedars-Sinai Prostate Cancer Center in Los Angeles, California; and the Massachusetts General Hospital in Boston, Massachusetts.
 Up to at least 2012, Redstone contributed $1.5 million to the Global Poverty Project.
 He gave millions of dollars to the Cambodian Children's Fund, a nonprofit program that provides a wide range of critical health and educational services to impoverished and abused children in the capital city of Phnom Penh. Redstone's contribution will be used to create the Sumner M. Redstone Child Rescue Center, a stand-alone facility originally scheduled to open during the fall of 2007 for children 5 to 16. In subsequent years Redstone continued to support this organization.
 In early 2010, Redstone pledged a $1 million gift to Autism Speaks in support of scientific research into the causes of autism and effective treatments. Redstone had given financial support to Autism Speaks previously. In 2011, Redstone gave an additional $500,000 to the group in support of its Translational Research Initiative, bringing his cumulative lifetime contribution to Autism Speaks to $1.7 million.
  In July 2010, Redstone donated $24 million to the Keck School of Medicine of the University of Southern California to support cancer research.
 In September 2012, Redstone donated $18 million to the Boston University School of Law. The gift funded, in part, the construction of the five-story Sumner M. Redstone Building, a classroom building which opened in 2014.
 Since October 2012, Redstone donated a total of $350,000 to the Go Campaign, which funds projects in 21 countries with a focus on helping orphans and other needy children.
 In May 2013, the Sumner M. Redstone Charitable Foundation donated $1 million to Literacy Inc., a New York City-based nonprofit literacy organization.
 In January 2014, it was announced that the Sumner M. Redstone Charitable Foundation had donated $10 million to Harvard Law School for public-interest fellowships, the largest charitable contribution ever made to the law school in support of public service. The money supports students who work in public-interest positions after graduation.

Personal life 
In 1947, he married Phyllis Gloria Raphael. They had two children: Brent Redstone and Shari Redstone. In 1999, they divorced when Phyllis Raphael served Sumner Redstone a 3 billion dollar divorce lawsuit which accused the mogul of adultery and cruelty. Sumner was seen with Hollywood producer Christine Peters in Paris and was quoted as saying at the time that he "wanted to spend the rest of his life with Christine"  As a result of the divorce, Redstone moved to Los Angeles where he continued to romantically pursue Peters. Peters went on to produce the hit romantic comedy "How to Lose a Guy in 10 Days" in Canada. As Redstone's patience ran out, he married Paula Fortunato, a former primary school teacher 39 years his junior. Redstone filed for divorce from Fortunato on October 17, 2008. Their divorce was finalized on January 22, 2009. Redstone owned a house in the Beverly Park area of Los Angeles, which he purchased in 2002 for $14.5 million.

In July 2010, Redstone was caught on tape trying to find the source of an apparently embarrassing leak within MTV. Redstone offered money and protection to a journalist if he would give up his source. Redstone had been pushing MTV management to give more airtime to the band the Electric Barbarellas. On the message, Redstone tells the reporter that "we're not going to kill" the source, adding "We just want to talk to him". The 87-year-old Redstone also told the reporter he would be "well rewarded and well protected" if he would reveal the source. Peter Lauria told NBC's Today show he would not do it. Viacom Inc. spokesman, Carl Folta confirmed to Today that it was Redstone's voice on the message and said he had made a mistake. A Viacom source told the New York Post, "Sumner wants to be consequential. Sumner is really proud of what he did. This guy is loving it… He likes people to know he's still alive".

In August 2015, Redstone split with his live-in girlfriend, Sydney Holland, after five years together.

In January 2019, Redstone and his family settled with his former live-in companion Manuela Herzer.  According to MarketWatch, "Herzer agreed to pay back $3.25 million of the tens of millions of gifts that Redstone gave her", and "the wide-ranging agreement ends all litigation between the two sides, who have been battling in the courts since the fall of 2015 when Redstone kicked Herzer out of his Beverly Hills mansion, replaced her as his health-care agent and wrote her out of his estate planning."

On August 11, 2020, Redstone died at his home in Los Angeles at the age of 97. The cause of death is unknown.

References

Further reading 
 
 Auletta, Ken. The Highwaymen:  Warriors of the Information Superhighway. New York: Random House, 1997. . .
 Redstone, Sumner. "Toward More Equitable Determination of Tax Liability by Averaging of Income: An Historical and Analytical Approach to Problems of Averaging". 1947. . Harvard Law School third year paper.
 Redstone, Sumner, and Peter Knobler. A Passion to Win: An Autobiography. London: Simon & Schuster, 2001. . .

External links 
 
 Sumner Redstone at Viacom, Inc.
 Sumner Redstone Foundation
 
 

1923 births
2020 deaths
20th-century American businesspeople
21st-century American businesspeople
American Zionists
United States Army personnel of World War II
American billionaires
American Jews
American media executives
American television company founders
Boston Latin School alumni
Businesspeople from Boston
California Democrats
Georgetown University Law Center alumni
Harvard College alumni
Harvard Law School alumni
Jewish American philanthropists
Keck School of Medicine of USC people
Lawyers from Boston
Massachusetts Democrats
Military personnel from Massachusetts
New York Rangers executives
Sumner
Signals Intelligence Service cryptographers
United States Army officers
Chairmen of ViacomCBS
21st-century American Jews